The Old Man is a 1931 mystery play by the British writer Edgar Wallace. Its original production  was staged at Wyndham's Theatre in London's West End for a ninety performance run. It is set entirely in the "Coat of Arms" tavern where a mysterious old man lurks in the background, reputedly an escapee from a lunatic asylum. The original cast included Alfred Drayton, Jack Melford, Harold Warrender and Finlay Currie.

Film adaptation
The same year the play was adapted into the film The Old Man directed by Manning Haynes. Wallace was closely associated with British Lion which produced the film.

References

Bibliography
 Goble, Alan. The Complete Index to Literary Sources in Film. Walter de Gruyter, 1999.
 Kabatchnik, Amnon. Blood on the Stage, 1975-2000: Milestone Plays of Crime, Mystery, and Detection : an Annotated Repertoire. Rowman & Littlefield, 2012.
 Wearing, J. P. The London Stage 1930–1939: A Calendar of Productions, Performers, and Personnel.  Rowman & Littlefield, 2014.

1931 plays
Plays by Edgar Wallace
Plays set in England
British plays adapted into films
West End plays